Guadalajara Centro railway station is the ninth station of Line 3 of Guadalajara's light rail system from south-east to north-west, and the tenth in the opposite direction; it is also a station with a large influx of passengers because it acts as a transfer station with Plaza Universidad on Line 2 of the system.

This station is located under 16 de Septiembre Avenue, between Eje Morelos (which separates Juárez and Hidalgo Guadalajara sectors) and Juárez Avenue (under which Line 2 runs). During the construction of Line 3 it was necessary to reinforce the structural box that includes the Line 2 tunnel that runs above the structural tunnel corresponding to Line 3; for this, sections called Milan Walls were built.

The station logo is the image of the Metropolitan Cathedral with three colors: the first is pink due to the color of Line 3, the second color is green for the transfer to Line 2 and the last color is red for the transfer to  Lines 1 and 3.

Gallery

Points of interest 

 Metropolitan Cathedral
 Former Cloister of San Agustín (CUAAD Music Departament)
 Former Cloister of Santa María de Gracia (CUAAD Plastic Arts School)
 Government Palace
 Municipal Palace
 Legislative Palace (Congress of Jalisco)
 Regional Museum
 Teatro Degollado
 Rotonda de los Jaliscienses Ilustres
 Octavio Paz Ibero-American Public Library
 Plaza de La Liberación
 Plaza Guadalajara
 Plaza de Armas
 Mercado Corona
 Edificio Camarena
 Museo de Cera (Wax Museum)

References 

Railway stations in Guadalajara
Guadalajara light rail system Line 3 stations
Centro, Guadalajara
Railway stations opened in 2020
Railway stations located underground in Mexico